Sfatul Țării ("Council of the Country") was a newspaper from the Moldavian Democratic Republic founded by Nicolae Alexandri in November 1917 as the newspaper of the legislative body Sfatul Țării. It was the first daily newspaper in Bessarabia.

References

Publications established in 1917
Publications disestablished in 1920
Moldavian Democratic Republic
Romanian-language newspapers published in Moldova